The following is a list of outfield association footballers who played in goal during a match, usually due to the injury, dismissal or other unavailability of the usual goalkeeper.

List of players

See also
 List of goalscoring goalkeepers

References

 
Outfield players in goal
Association football player non-biographical articles